Khela ( "Game") (2008) is a Bengali film by Rituparno Ghosh. The film is about an idealistic director's (Prosenjit Chatterjee) quest to make a film with a boy who he thinks is just perfect for the role. Khela also marks actress Manisha Koirala's foray into Bengali cinema.

Plot
Khela is about an idealistic director's (Prosenjit Chatterjee) desire to make a film with a boy who he thinks is just perfect for the role.
His wife (Manisha Koirala) wants a baby and the husband feels that the child will compromise the artiste in him. Here the aspiring but passionate film maker creates a bond with a superb rut of a child and who does feel that a child may spoil his career, started re-discovering a child within him. The film also deals with relationships and emotions but with a twist by adding up humor, adventure and edge-of-the-seat mystery.

Cast
 Prosenjit Chatterjee as Raja
 Manisha Koirala as Sheela
 Raima Sen as Anjali
 Akashneel Dutt Mukherjee as Abhirup
 Bharat Kaul
Roopa Ganguly

Reception
The film received mixed reviews. The Telegraph(Calcutta) stated that it was "Rituparno’s conscious attempt to break away from the 'adult' tag of Antarmahal and Dosar, and re-connect with the Bangali family." While noted film critic Rajeev Masand said that the film is "Khela is not a bad film, but one that requires much patience on your part", he also appreciated the "fine performances from principals"

References

External links

telegraphindia.com

2008 films
2000s Bengali-language films
Films scored by Raja Narayan Deb
Films scored by Sanjoy Das
Bengali-language Indian films
Films directed by Rituparno Ghosh